Sandra Bessudo Lion is a French Colombian marine biologist from the École pratique des hautes études (EPHE) in Paris. She is a professional diver and involved in the conservation of marine biodiversity and the environment. She is the founder and director of the Malpelo Foundation and served as a presidential counselor for environment management for Colombian president Juan Manual Santos.

Education 
Bessudo earned a Masters in Life and Earth Sciences Studies in Perpignan (France).

Career 
In 1999, Bessudo founded the Malpelo Foundation. As director of the Malpelo and other marine ecosystems foundation, she was an active promoter in the establishment of the Isla Malpelo Flora and Fauna Sanctuary, making it a "Particular Sensitive Area" recognized by the International Maritime Organization (IMO). In 2006, UNESCO recognized the area as a World Heritage Site. She led several research projects on sharks using acoustic and satellite telemetry.

In December of 2011, Colombian president Juan Manuel Santos appointed Bessudo as new director of the Presidential Agency of International Cooperation of Colombia, a governmental entity in charge of managing, technically coordinating and leading the public and private international cooperations. Before that, she had acted as high presidential counselor for environmental management, biodiversity, water and climate change.

Bessudo also worked in the special administrative unit of the National Natural Parks System of the Ministry of Environment.

Bessudo also served as Coordinator of the Workshops and Cycles of Conferences in Colombia for the International Year of the Oceans. Diving instructor in Club El Nogal and diving Director in Aviatur.  Sandra Bessudo has independently produced dozens of publications, videos and specialized documentaries.

Awards 
Among her awards, Bessudo was recognized with the Distinguished Service Medal to the General Navy Direction, granted by the Colombian National Army and the 2011 Biosphere Awareness Award granted by the Mayors of Cadiz, Spain and Mariquita, Tolima in Colombia.  She also received the Environmental Civil Order Merit "Thomas van der Hammen" Grade of Grand Cross of Gold, delivered in the Colombian Congress facilities and awarded by the Council of Environmental NGOs, among many other that she has received in Colombia and abroad.

References

External links 
 

People from Bogotá
Living people
Colombian people of French descent
Colombian people of Belgian descent
Underwater divers
Colombian environmentalists
Colombian women environmentalists
21st-century Colombian women politicians
21st-century Colombian politicians
Presidential advisers of Colombia
Year of birth missing (living people)